William Henry Crocker I (January 13, 1861 – September 25, 1937) was an American banker, the president of Crocker National Bank and a prominent member of the Republican Party.

Early life
Crocker was born on January 19, 1861, in Sacramento, California. His father, Charles Crocker (1822-1888), one of the "Big Four" railroad magnates, was the builder of the Central Pacific Railroad. 

His nephew, Harry Crocker, was a movie star in the 1920s and, at one time, the personal assistant of Charlie Chaplin. His cousin, Aimee Crocker, was a Bohemian mystic who garnered publicity for her extravagant parties in New York, San Francisco and Paris, for her five husbands and many lovers, for her tattoos, and for living 10 years in the Far East, not as a tourist, but as if a native.

He attended Phillips Academy, Andover and Yale University, where he was a brother of the Delta Kappa Epsilon fraternity (Phi chapter).

Career
Crocker served as president of Crocker National Bank. When much of the city of San Francisco was destroyed by the fire from the 1906 earthquake, Crocker and his bank were major forces in financing reconstruction.

Philanthropy
After the 1906 earthquake and fire had left the Crocker mansions in ruins, in 1907 he donated the Crocker family's  Nob Hill block for Grace Cathedral.

He was a member of the University of California Board of Regents for nearly thirty years and funded the Lawrence Radiation Laboratory's million-volt x-ray tube at the UC hospital and the "medical" Crocker cyclotron used for neutron therapy at Berkeley. In 1936, Crocker contributed $75,000 toward the building of a laboratory for Ernest O. Lawrence at the University of California, Berkeley, which was subsequently named "Crocker Radiation Laboratory" in his honor. This laboratory became home to the Berkeley 60" cyclotron. In the 1960s, parts of this cyclotron were moved to the University of California, Davis, where they served as the basis for the Crocker Nuclear Laboratory, which inherited its name from the original.

Crocker also chaired the Panama-Pacific Exposition Committee and SE Community Chest, and was a key member of the committee that built the San Francisco Opera House and Veterans Building. Crocker was the founder of Crocker Middle School located in Hillsborough, California. The Sacramento, California, home of Crocker's uncle, Edwin B. Crocker, was converted into the Crocker Art Museum, which was the first art museum to open in the West.

Philately

Crocker was a noted philatelist and the owner of the unique block of four of the 1869 24c United States stamps with inverted centre formerly the property of William Thorne.

Personal life
Crocker was married to Ethel Sperry (1861–1934), the daughter of Simon Willard Sperry and Caroline Elizabeth (née Barker) Sperry, and sister to Elizabeth Helen Sperry (wife of Price André Poniatowski). Ethel was the leading patron of French Impressionist art in California at that time. In the 1890s, Crocker's wife, and California Impressionist Lucy Bacon, who studied in France under Pissarro, lent William Kingston Vickery, owner of the San Francisco art gallery Vickery, Atkins & Torrey, a number of French Impressionist paintings. Vickery then supervised a series of these loan exhibitions in San Francisco and introduced Impressionism to California in the form of paintings by Monet, Eugène Boudin, Paul Cézanne, Camille Pissarro, Pierre-Auguste Renoir, and Edgar Degas. Ethel also sponsored the studies of the Zoellner Quartet with César Thomson in Belgium. After six years in Europe, the quartet returned to the United States, and became a tireless force promoting classical music outside established centers and in Southern California.

Together, William and Ethel were the parents of four children:

 Ethel Mary Crocker (1891–1964), who married French Count Andre de Limur in 1918.
 William Willard Crocker (1893–1964), who married Ruth Hobart, daughter of playboy Walter Hobart and granddaughter of the Comstock silver millionaire Walter S. Hobart, in 1923. They divorced in 1948 and he married Gertrude ( Hopkins) Parrott, former wife of William G. Parrott. After her death in 1958, he married Elizabeth ( Fullerton) Coleman, former wife of George L. Coleman, in 1960. After his death, she married Alexander Montagu, 10th Duke of Manchester.
 Helen Crocker (1897–1966), who married Henry Potter Russell, a son of Charles Howland Russell who was previously married to Ethel Borden Harriman.
 Charles Crocker (1904–1961), who married Virginia Bennett in 1926. They divorced and he married Marguerite Brokaw, a daughter of Howard Crosby Brokaw, in 1938. After his death, she married Charles Norton Adams.

William Crocker died on September 25, 1937, at his home in Hillsborough, California. His Skyfarm mansion was purchased by W. Clement Stone, and was donated to the Nueva School in 1971; the mansion currently houses Nueva's lower school division.

Descendants
His grandson, also named William, is a retired anthropologist who worked at the Smithsonian Institution specializing in Canela Indians of Brazil.

Legacy
The public middle school in Hillsborough, California, is named after him, Crocker Middle School.

Family tree

References

External links

Charles Henry Crocker letters, 1896-1900. Collection guide, California State Library, California History Room.
The Political Graveyard: Index to Politicians: Crocker to Crocket at politicalgraveyard.com
Cypress Lawn image

1861 births
1937 deaths
Phillips Academy alumni
American philanthropists
People from Burlingame, California
Businesspeople from San Francisco
Yale University alumni
University of California regents
California Republicans
People from Hillsborough, California
Crocker family
American philatelists
American bank presidents
Burials at Cypress Lawn Memorial Park